Island Park or Horlick Park is a neighborhood park covering  of land in Racine, Wisconsin. The park is located on an island, surrounded on both sides by the Root River. The land for the park was donated by William Horlick, the inventor of malted milk.

References

Parks in Wisconsin
Racine, Wisconsin
Protected areas of Racine County, Wisconsin
Tourist attractions in Racine, Wisconsin